The East Rutherford School District is a community public school district that serves students in pre-kindergarten through eighth grade from East Rutherford, in Bergen County, New Jersey. A small annex was constructed in 2001 across the street from the Faust main building which includes a small office and four classrooms used for pre-kindergarten and fifth graders. McKenzie School is used for children from Kindergarten until fourth grade.

As of the 2018–19 school year, the district, comprised of two schools, had an enrollment of 819 students and 73.2 classroom teachers (on an FTE basis), for a student–teacher ratio of 11.2:1.

The district is classified by the New Jersey Department of Education as being in District Factor Group "CD", the sixth-highest of eight groupings. District Factor Groups organize districts statewide to allow comparison by common socioeconomic characteristics of the local districts. From lowest socioeconomic status to highest, the categories are A, B, CD, DE, FG, GH, I and J.

For grades ninth through twelfth grades, public school students attend the Henry P. Becton Regional High School in East Rutherford, which serves high school students from both Carlstadt and East Rutherford as part of the Carlstadt-East Rutherford Regional School District. As of the 2018–19 school year, the high school had an enrollment of 491 students and 37.2 classroom teachers (on an FTE basis), for a student–teacher ratio of 13.2:1. Starting in the 2020–21 school year, students from Maywood will start attending the school as part of a sending/receiving relationship; Maywood's transition to Becton will be complete after the final group of twelfth graders graduates from Hackensack High School at the end of the 2023–24 school year.

A January 2020 referendum to fund $35.5 million in improvements to both schools and to district offices was passed by voters by a margin of 18 votes. With approximately $5 million in state aid to cover the project included, the project would add $360 to property taxes assessed on a home at the borough average.

Schools 
Schools in the district (with 2018–19 enrollment data from the National Center for Education Statistics) are:
McKenzie School with 454 students in grades PreK–5
Brian Barrow, Principal
Alfred S. Faust School with 345 students in grades 6–8
Regina Barrale, Principal

Administration 
Core members of the district's administration are:
Giovanni Giancaspro, Superintendent
Lameka Augustin, Business Administrator / Board Secretary

Board of education
The district's board of education, comprised of seven members, sets policy and oversees the fiscal and educational operation of the district through its administration. As a Type II school district, the board's trustees are elected directly by voters to serve three-year terms of office on a staggered basis, with either two three seats up for election each year held (since 2014) as part of the November general election. The board appoints a superintendent to oversee the day-to-day operation of the district.

References

External links 
East Rutherford School District

East Rutherford School District, National Center for Education Statistics

East Rutherford, New Jersey
New Jersey District Factor Group CD
School districts in Bergen County, New Jersey